Marko Barać (born 18 March 1989) is a Serbian professional basketball coach for Mega Basket of the ABA League.

Coaching career 
In 2009, Barać joined a youth system of Superfund as an assistant coach. In 2011, he joined the Crvena zvezda under-18 team as an assistant coach, as well. For the 2013–14, Barać was the head coach for We're Basket Ortona of the Italian 3rd-tier Serie B. Barać was an assistant coach for Energa Czarni Słupsk during the 2014–15 PLK season under Dejan Mijatović. Barać coached Belgrade-based team KK Torlak for two seasons, between 2016 and 2019. In the 2018–19 KLS season, Barać was head coach for Mladost Zemun.

In August 2019, Barać joined Bosnian team Igokea as an assistant coach. Occasionally, he was the interim head coach due to health issues of the Igokea head coaches Aleksandar Trifunović (October 2019) and Dragan Bajić (January 2022). He left Igokea in June 2022.

On 20 June 2022, Mega Basket hired Barać as their new head coach.

National team coaching career 
Between 2012 and 2014, Barać was an assistant coach for Serbian youth teams led by head coach Dejan Mijatović, winning three medals. In August 2012, he won a bronze medal with Serbia U18 at the FIBA Europe Under-18 Championship. With the Serbia under-19 team he won a silver medal at the 2013 FIBA Under-19 World Championship. In July 2014, Barać won a bronze medal with Serbia U20 at the FIBA Europe Under-20 Championship.

Career achievements 
As assistant coach
 Bosnian League champion: 2 (with Igokea: 2019–20, 2021–22)
 Bosnian Cup winner: 2 (with Igokea: 2020–21, 2021–22)

References

External links
 Coach Profile at eurobasket.com

1989 births
Living people
KK Igokea coaches
KK Mladost Zemun coaches
Serbian men's basketball coaches
Serbian expatriate basketball people in Bosnia and Herzegovina
Serbian expatriate basketball people in Italy
Serbian expatriate basketball people in Poland
Sportspeople from Belgrade